Love Is Everything: The Jane Siberry Anthology is a two-disc compilation of songs by the Canadian singer-songwriter Jane Siberry. It was released in 2002 and contains material dating back to her debut release in 1981.

There are also two new tracks; "Are You Burning, Little Candle?" was originally only available on a rare CD single, while "Map of the World (Part IV): Pilgrim" extends the series of "Map" songs appearing on earlier albums.

The set also includes a booklet containing Siberry's reflections on the songs and a biography.

All tracks were digitally remastered.

Track listing
Disc one
"In The Blue Light"
"Bessie"
"The Mystery at Ogwen's Farm"
"You Don't Need"
"The Taxi Ride"
"One More Colour"
"The Walking (And Constantly)"
"Red High Heels"
"The Lobby"
"Bound by the Beauty"
"Everything Reminds Me of My Dog"
"The Life Is the Red Wagon"
"Calling All Angels"
"Love Is Everything"
"Sail Across the Water"

Disc two
 "Temple"
 "Goodbye Sweet Pumpkinhead"
 "Maria"
 "The Squirrel Crossed the Road"
 "Peony"
 "Mimi on the Beach"
 "Mimi Speaks"
 "Barkis Is Willin'"
 "Are You Burning, Little Candle?"
 "All Through the Night"
 "The Water Is Wide"
 "Map of the World (Part I)"
 "Map of the World (Part II)"
 "Map of the World (Part III): Are We Dancing Now?"
 "Map of the World (Part IV): Pilgrim"

Personnel
 
 
 Jane Siberry – Organ, Synthesizer, Bells, Vocals, Organ (Hammond), Piano, Keyboards, Harp, Accordion, Guitar, Harmonica, Percussion Sampling, Loops, producer,
 John Switzer – Bass, Vocals, Percussion, producer
 Brian Eno – Oboe, Organ (Hammond), Shaker, Tambo Drums, Guitar Effects, producer
 Jon Goldsmith – Keyboards, producer
 Michael Brook – Guitar, producer, Mixing
 Ken Myhr – Dulcimer, Guitar, Guitar Synth, Percussion, Vocals
 Tim Ray – Organ, Piano
 Doug Wilde – Keyboards
 Rob Yale – Keyboards, Fairlight
 Teddy Borowiecki – Percussion, Accordion, Piano
 Anne Bourne – Keyboards, Vocals
 Jamie West-Oram – Guitar
 Larry Baeder – Guitar
 Debbie Knapper – Guitar
 Bryant Didier – Bass
 Christopher Thomas – Bass
 Gail Ann Dorsey – Bass, Vocals
 Ben Mink – Viola
 Sandy Baron – Violin
 Alex McMaster – Strings
 
 Sarah McElcheran – Trumpet
 David Travers-Smith – Trumpet, Live Mixing, Live Recording, Mixing, engineer, Sampling
 Steven Donald – Trombone
 Jennifer Weeks – Oboe
 Dave Houghton – Drums
 Glenn Milchem – Drums
 James Pinker – Drums
 Dean Sharp – Drums
 Stich Wynston – Drums
 Brian Blade – Drums
 Al Cross – Percussion, Drums, Linn Drum
 Ian McLauchlan – Percussion
 Rebecca Jenkins – Vocals
 k.d. lang – Vocals
 Christopher Rouse – Vocals
 David Ramsden – Vocals
 Catherine Russell – Vocals
 Gina Stepaniuk – Vocals
 Cherie Camp – Vocals
 Rebecca Campbell – Vocals
 Lisa Lindo – Vocals
 Quisha Wint – Vocals

Other credits
 
 
 Hillary Bratton – Compilation Producer
 Dan Hersch – Remastering
 Bill Inglot – Remastering
 Kerry Crawford – Producer
 John Naslen – Producer, engineer
 David Bradstreet – Producer, engineer
 Carl Keesee – Producer, engineer
 Kevin Killen – Mixing
 Chad Irschick – Mixing
 Jim Zolis – Engineer, Mixing
 Michael Phillip Wojewoda – Engineer, Mixing
 Rick Starks – Engineer
 Jeff Wolpert – Engineer
 Gary Furniss – Engineer
 David Ferri – Engineer
 Ron Searles – Engineer
 George Rondina – Engineer
 
 Maria Villar – Art Direction, Design
 Andrew MacNaughtan – Artwork, Photography
 Chris Taylor – Photography
 Mark Abrahms – Photography
 Floria Sigismondi – Cover Photography
 Michiko Suzuki – Photography
 Frank W. Ockenfels – Photography
 Emily Cagan – Product Manager
 Steven Chean – Editorial Supervision
 Gary Peterson – Discographical Annotation
 Malia Doss – Licensing
 Gladys Sanchez – Licensing
 Randy Perry – Project Assistant
 Amy Utstein – Project Assistant
 Leigh Hall – Project Assistant, A&R
 Karen Ahmed – A&R
 

2002 compilation albums
Jane Siberry albums